Crobylophora metallifera is a moth in the  family Lyonetiidae that is endemic to South Africa.

References

Endemic moths of South Africa
Lyonetiidae
Moths described in 1891
Moths of Africa